Encouragement of Climb is a slice of life anime television series based on the manga series of the same name written by Shiro and serialized in Comic Earth Star magazine. Shy acrophobic Aoi Yukimura reunites with her childhood friend and mountaineering enthusiast Hinata Kuraue, on the first day of high school, and is reluctantly dragged on an adventure to explore the wonders of mountain climbing. The girls hope to ultimately see the sunrise from atop the mountain they climbed as children once more. Along the way, Aoi and Hinata make new friends and share many experiences. The series is produced by Eight Bit and directed by Yusuke Yamamoto with character designs by Yuusuke Matsuo.

The twelve episode first season consists of 5-minute-long episodes and aired between January 3 and March 21, 2013, on Tokyo MX and later by SUN-TV, AT-X and KBS along with online streaming by Niconico.  Earth Star Entertainment released the complete season in Japan on a single Blu-ray and DVD volume on May 14, 2013. The set also included an unaired 13th OVA episode. The second season consists of 15-minute-long episodes and aired on Tokyo MX between July 9, 2014, and December 24, 2014, followed by later airings on KBS, SDT, BS11 and AT-X along with online streaming on Niconico. Bonus episodes were included with the 2nd and 7th Blu-ray and DVD volumes of the second season, released on October 24, 2014, and March 27, 2015, respectively. An original video animation, titled Omoide Present, was released on October 28, 2017. A third season, also consisting of 15-minute long episodes, aired between July 2 and September 24, 2018. All of these seasons were simulcast with English subtitles by Crunchyroll.  A new anime television series titled , consisting of 12 full-length episodes, aired from October 5 to December 21, 2022, and is being simulcast on Sentai Filmworks' HIDIVE service.

Episode list

Encouragement of Climb (2013)

Encouragement of Climb: Second Season (2014)

Encouragement of Climb: Omoide Present (2017 OVA)

Encouragement of Climb: Third Season (2018)

Encouragement of Climb: Next Summit (2022)

Notes

References

External links
 Yama no Susume: First to Third Season official anime website 
 Yama no Susume: First Season official anime website 
 Yama no Susume: Second Season official anime story website 
 Yama no Susume: Omoide Present official anime story website 
 Yama no Susume: Third Season official anime story website 
 Yama no Susume: Next Summit Official anime website 

Lists of anime episodes